Togo competed at the 2018 Winter Olympics in Pyeongchang, South Korea, from 9 to 25 February 2018. It was represented by single athlete, cross-country skier Mathilde-Amivi Petitjean.

Competitors
The following is the list of number of competitors participating in the Togolese delegation per sport.

Alpine skiing 

Togo qualified one female athlete, but Alessia Afi Dipol withdrew.

Cross-country skiing 

Togo qualified one female athlete. 

Distance

Sprint

References

Nations at the 2018 Winter Olympics
2018
2018 in Togolese sport